The Walhonding River is a principal tributary of the Muskingum River,  long, in east-central Ohio in the United States. Via the Muskingum and Ohio Rivers, it is part of the watershed of the Mississippi River.

The Walhonding flows for its entire length in Coshocton County.  It is formed by the confluence of the Mohican River and the Kokosing River and flows generally east-southeast, passing through Mohawk Dam, which was built in the 1930s by the U.S. Army Corps of Engineers for the purpose of flood control in the Muskingum River watershed, and through the towns of Nellie and Warsaw.  Downstream of Warsaw it collects Killbuck Creek.  It meets the Tuscarawas River at the city of Coshocton to form the Muskingum River.

Variant names
According to the Geographic Names Information System, the Walhonding River has also been known historically as:
 Muskingum River ("West branch")
 Walhandink River
 West Branch of the Muskingum
 White Woman Creek
 White Woman River
 White Womans Creek
 White Womans River
 Whitemans Creek
 Whitewoman Creek
 Whitewomans Creek
 Wolhonding River

The name "White Womans Creek" (and variants) was probably originally intended to refer specifically either to the Kokosing River or to the Mohican River; and during that same period (mid-1700s), the Walhonding was known only as the "West branch of the Muskingum". The final name "Walhonding" was newly chosen by legislators sometime after the 1820s.

See also
List of rivers of Ohio

References

Rivers of Coshocton County, Ohio
Muskingum River
Rivers of Ohio